Hypermastigia (hypermastigids) within microbiology, is the name used for a group of flagellate parasites which were placed under the excavata class. They are now treated as belonging to one of the groups Tritrichomonadea, Hypotrichomonadea, or Trichomonadea within the Parabasalia.

References

Metamonads